Tracie Chima Utoh, also known as Tracie Utoh-Ezeajugh, is a Nigerian playwright and Professor of Film and Theatre Design at Nnamdi Azikiwe University. In 2015 she was an ACLS/ASA Presidential Fellow, a scheme which invites "outstanding Africa-based scholars" to attend the African Studies Association annual conference and spend a week in an American institution before the conference.

Her academic speciality is the study of the use of costume, makeup and body art, "both as art and as aids to characterisation on stage and in films".

N.E. Izuu, writing in Creative Artist: A Journal of Theatre and Media Studies said that Utoh "exhibits a profound proclivity towards the reiteration of humanist agitation (rather than feminist) which aims at rechannelling literary emphasis to more debilitating phenomena in contemporary society other than the re-inscription of gendered disputations".

Selected publications

Plays
Who owns this coffin? : and other plays (1999, Jos, Nigeria : Sweetop Publications)
Our wives have gone mad again! and other plays (2001, Awka, Anambra State [Nigeria] : Valid Pub. Co. (Nig.) Ltd)
Nneora : an African doll's house (2005, Awka : Valid Publishing Co)

Other writings
The humanities and globalisation in the 3rd millennium edited by  A B C Chiegboka, Tracie Chima Utoh, and G I Ukechukwu (2010, Nimo, Nigeria : Rex Charles & Patrick)

References

Year of birth missing (living people)
Living people
Nigerian dramatists and playwrights
Nigerian women writers
Nigerian women academics
Igbo people